Novoaidar (Ukrainian and ) is an urban-type settlement and the administrative center of Shchastia Raion of Luhansk Oblast in eastern Ukraine, located east of Sievierodonetsk.

Until July 2020, Novoaidar served as the center of Novoaidar Raion of Ukraine. As part of the 2020 reform of the administrative divisions of Ukraine, the number of raions (districts) in Luhansk Oblasts was reduced to six and Shchastia Raion was created. Novoaidar remained an adminstrative center, serving as the administrative center of Shchastia Raion of Luhansk Oblast, Ukraine.

From 2014 in the War in Donbas the settlement remained under Ukrainian government control (unlike many other places in the Luhansk Oblast). However, just over a week after the 2022 Russian invasion of Ukraine began, it was taken by Russian forces, on March 3. 

Following the 2022 annexation referendums in Russian-occupied Ukraine, Russia has claimed the settlement as their territory, and it remains under Russian control.

History

The area around the Aidar was initially settled by Don Cossacks in the late 16th century. In the second half of the 17th century, there was further development of the settlement.

After 2014

During the 2014 Ukrainian presidential election, pro-Russian separatists tried and were allegedly stopped from stealing cast ballots, according to the Ukrainian interior ministry one person was killed and another injured in the shootout.

2022 Russian invasion of Ukraine 

On 3 March 2022, just over a week after the invasion began, the Luhansk PR announced that Novoaidar had been captured by Russian forces.

Economy

Transportation
Novoaidar is on Highway H21 which connects Starobilsk and Luhansk.

There is a railway line in Novoaidar, which is currently disconnected from the rest of the railway network in Ukraine. To the south, it extends to Kondrashivska Nova, in Stanytsia Luhanska, and to the north it runs to Starobilsk, crosses the border to Russia, and further runs to Valuyki. In Novoaidar, there are three railway stations: Noviy Aidar, 920 km, and Marsivskyi. There is infrequent passenger traffic between Kondrashivska Nova and Lantrativka.

References

Urban-type settlements in Shchastia Raion
Shchastia Raion
Starobelsky Uyezd